Vexillum (Costellaria) vespula is a species of small sea snail, marine gastropod mollusk in the family Costellariidae, the ribbed miters.

Description
The shell size is 16 mm

Distribution
This species is distributed in the seas along the Philippines.

References
Notes

Bibliography
 Turner H. 2001. Katalog der Familie Costellariidae Macdonald, 1860. Conchbooks. 1–100, page(s): 67

External links
 

vespula
Gastropods described in 2001